The Memorial Wall is a memorial at the Central Intelligence Agency headquarters in Langley, Virginia. It honors 139 CIA employees who died in the line of service.

Memorial
The Memorial Wall is located in the Original Headquarters Building lobby on the north wall. There are 139 stars carved into the white Alabama marble wall, each one representing an employee who died in the line of service. Paramilitary officers of the  Special Activities Center comprise the majority of those memorialized.

A black Moroccan goatskin-bound book, called the "Book of Honor", sits in a steel frame beneath the stars, its "slender case jutting out from the wall just below the field of stars", and is "framed in stainless steel and topped by an inch-thick plate of glass." Inside it shows the stars, arranged by year of death and, when possible, lists the names of employees who died in CIA service alongside them. The identities of the unnamed stars remain secret, even in death. In 1997, there were 70 stars, 29 of which had names. There were 79 stars in 2002, 83 in 2004, 90 in 2009, 107 in 2013, 111 in 2014, 125 in 2017, 129 in 2018, 133 in 2019, 135 in 2020, 137 in 2021, and 139 in 2022. Of the 139 entries in the book, 102 contain names, while 37 do not. The 37 not named are represented only by a gold star followed by a blank space.

The wall bears the inscription "In honor of those members of the Central Intelligence Agency who gave their lives in the service of their country." The wall is flanked by the flag of the United States on the left and a flag bearing the CIA seal on the right.

Adding new stars

When new names are added to the Book of Honor, stone carver Tim Johnston of the Carving and Restoration Team in Manassas, Virginia adds a new star to the wall if that person's star is not already present. Johnston learned the process of creating the stars from the original sculptor of the wall, Harold Vogel, who created the first 31 stars and the Memorial Wall inscription when the wall was created in July 1974. Although the wall was "first conceived as a small plaque to recognize those from the CIA who died in Southeast Asia, the idea quickly grew to a memorial for Agency employees who died in the line of duty." The process used by Johnston to add a new star is as follows:

Candidates
The Honor and Merit Awards Board (HMAB) recommends approval of candidates to be listed on the wall to the Director of the Central Intelligence Agency. The CIA states that

[i]nclusion on the Memorial Wall is awarded posthumously to employees who lose their lives while serving their country in the field of intelligence. Death may occur in the foreign field or in the United States. Death must be of an inspirational or heroic character while in the performance of duty; or as the result of an act of terrorism while in the performance of duty; or as an act of premeditated violence targeted against an employee, motivated solely by that employee's Agency affiliation; or in the performance of duty while serving in areas of hostilities or other exceptionally hazardous conditions where the death is a direct result of such hostilities or hazards.  After approval by the director, the Office of Protocol arranges for a new star to be placed on the Wall.

The first suicide to be added to the wall was for employee Ranya Abdelsayed, who died by suicide in 2013 after working for a year in Afghanistan.  CIA leadership was criticized by some who feel she did not meet the criteria for the wall.

Current stars and known individuals

Other fatalities

First fatality
Jane Wallis Burrell was the first CIA officer to die in the Agency's service when an Air France DC-3 from Brussels crashed on approach to the Le Bourget Airport near Paris on January 6, 1948, killing all five crew members and 10 of the 11 passengers. She died only 110 days after the CIA was officially established the previous September. Burrell was never a candidate for a star on the CIA's Memorial Wall because the wall commemorates Agency employees who died in specific circumstances and deaths from commercial aircraft crashes have generally not qualified.

Civil Air Transport
On May 6, 1954, during the Battle of Dien Bien Phu, two CIA pilots, James B. McGovern, Jr. and Wallace Buford, were killed when their C-119 Flying Boxcar cargo plane was shot down while on a resupply mission for the French military. They worked for Civil Air Transport, which was later reorganized as Air America. Neither of them has a star on the Memorial Wall.

Air America
There were more than 30, pilots and other crew members, of the CIA's Air America company who were killed during the Vietnam War that were not counted as part of the Agency even though they worked for it. The names of some of them were: John M. Bannerman, Eugene DeBruin, Joseph C. Cheney, Charles Herrick, John Lerdo Oyer, Jack J. Wells, George L. Ritter, Edward J. Weissenback, and Roy F. Townley.

See also
 Captain John Birch killed in 1945 while serving with US Military Intelligence
 Lieutenant Colonel A. Peter Dewey killed in 1945 while serving with the OSS
 Military Intelligence Hall of Fame
 National Security Agency/Central Security Service Cryptologic Memorial

References

External links 
 
 
 CIA, Memorial Wall Publication, 2015
 Booknotes interview with Ted Gup on The Book of Honor: Covert Lives and Classified Deaths at the CIA, August 27, 2000.

Central Intelligence Agency
Monuments and memorials in Virginia